Kham Ta Kla is a district (amphoe) in the northern part of Sakon Nakhon province, northeast Thailand.

Geography
Neighboring districts are (from the southeast clockwise) Akat Amnuai, Wanon Niwat, Ban Muang of Sakon Nakhon Province, Phon Charoen and Seka of Bueng Kan province.

History
The minor district (king amphoe) was created on 15 September 1976, when the three tambons Kham Ta Kla, Nong Bua Sim, and Na Tae were split off from Wanon Niwat district. It was upgraded to a full district on 13 July 1981.

Administration
The district is divided into four sub-districts (tambons), which are further subdivided into 57 villages (mubans). Kham Ta Kla is a sub-district municipality (thesaban tambon) which covers parts of tambon Kham Ta Kla. There are a further four tambon administrative organizations (TAO).

References

External links
amphoe.com

Kham Ta Kla